The Dead and the Damned 2 (also The Dead, the Damned, and the Darkness and Tom Sawyer vs Zombies) is a 2014 American horror film written and directed by Rene Perez.  It was released direct-to-video on October 7, 2014, and is the sequel to the 2010 film The Dead and the Damned.

Plot 
In the future, Lt. Colonel Sawyer and a mute girl, Stephanie, attempt to survive in a post-apocalyptic land crawling with zombies.

Cast 
 Robert Tweten as Lt. Colonel Sawyer
 Iren Levy as Stephanie
 John J. Welsh as Wilson
 Richard Tyson as Sheriff
 Jenny Allford as Mrs. Sawyer
 Christopher Kriesa as Speaker of the House Gates
 David A. Lockhart as Mortimer

Production 
Filming took place in Redding, California.

Release 
Inception Media Group released it on DVD and video on demand on October 7, 2014.

Reception 
Mark Burger of Yes! Weekly wrote that it has a "few good moments, but by any title it's nothing we haven't seen a lot of recently".  Matt Boiselle of Dread Central rated it 2.5/5 stars and wrote, "[I]f you're simply willing to accept this as another run-of-the-mill zombie shoot-em-up, you should give it a go."  Todd Martin of HorrorNews.Net wrote, "I really enjoyed The Dead and the Damned 2 and thought that it was one of the best zombie movies I've seen in a very long time."

References

External links 
 
 

2014 films
2014 direct-to-video films
2014 horror films
2010s science fiction horror films
American direct-to-video films
American zombie films
American independent films
American post-apocalyptic films
Direct-to-video horror films
Direct-to-video sequel films
Films shot in California
Films set in the future
2010s English-language films
2010s American films